Harry Potter is a series of fantasy novels by J. K. Rowling.

Harry Potter related topics include:

The original books
The Harry Potter books are 7 novels about a boy who learns he is a famous wizard:
 Harry Potter and the Philosopher's Stone—published as Harry Potter and the Sorcerer's Stone in the United States
 Harry Potter and the Chamber of Secrets
 Harry Potter and the Prisoner of Azkaban
 Harry Potter and the Goblet of Fire
 Harry Potter and the Order of the Phoenix
 Harry Potter and the Half-Blood Prince
 Harry Potter and the Deathly Hallows

Films
, there are eleven motion picture adaptions based on the world, characters and books created by J. K. Rowling. There are eight motion picture adaptations of the Harry Potter novels by J. K. Rowling; the final novel is split into two cinematic parts. While the remaining motion picture adaptions are inspired by both the companion book Fantastic Beasts and Where to Find Them as well has original content developed by JK Rowling. Seven of the eight screenplays were written by Steve Kloves. The fifth was penned by Michael Goldenberg. Both Fantastic Beasts films were written by JK Rowling . David Heyman has produced the franchise, which has seen four different directors. All ten films are distributed by Warner Bros. In 2016 , a prequel to the harry potter films titled  Fantastic Beasts and Where to Find Them was released. A sequel to Fantastic Beasts entitled Fantastic Beasts: The Crimes of Grindelwald was released in 2018. In April 2022 the third part Fantastic Beasts: The Secrets of Dumbledore was released. Two more instalments of the Fantastic Beasts series are tentatively  planned for release.  

 Wizarding World - The shared universe of the Harry Potter and Fantastic Beasts film series  

 Harry Potter (film series)
List of Harry Potter cast members
 Directed by Chris Columbus:
 Harry Potter and the Philosopher's Stone (film)  (known in the United States as "Harry Potter and the Sorcerer's Stone")
 Harry Potter and the Chamber of Secrets (film)
 Directed by Alfonso Cuarón:
 Harry Potter and the Prisoner of Azkaban (film)
 Directed by Mike Newell:
 Harry Potter and the Goblet of Fire (film)
 Directed by David Yates:
 Harry Potter and the Order of the Phoenix (film)
 Harry Potter and the Half-Blood Prince (film)
 Harry Potter and the Deathly Hallows – Part 1
 Harry Potter and the Deathly Hallows – Part 2
Production of Harry Potter and the Deathly Hallows

 Fantastic Beasts (film series)
 List of Fantastic Beasts cast members
 List of Fantastic Beasts characters
 Directed by David Yates:
 Fantastic Beasts and Where to Find Them (film)
 Fantastic Beasts: The Crimes of Grindelwald
 Fantastic Beasts: The Secrets of Dumbledore

Music
Music of the Harry Potter films
 Harry Potter and the Philosopher's Stone soundtrack
 Harry Potter and the Chamber of Secrets soundtrack
 Harry Potter and the Prisoner of Azkaban soundtrack
 Harry Potter and the Goblet of Fire soundtrack
 Harry Potter and the Order of the Phoenix soundtrack
 Harry Potter and the Half-Blood Prince  soundtrack
 Harry Potter and the Deathly Hallows – Part 1 soundtrack
 Harry Potter and the Deathly Hallows – Part 2 soundtrack
Music of the Fantastic Beasts films
 Fantastic Beasts and Where to Find Them soundtrack
 Fantastic Beasts: The Crimes of Grindelwald soundtrack

Other works
 Wizarding World Digital
 Harry Potter and the Cursed Child
Harry Potter 20th Anniversary: Return to Hogwarts
Secondary books
Fantastic Beasts and Where to Find Them
 Quidditch Through the Ages
 The Tales of Beedle the Bard
Short stories
 Prequel
 Hogwarts: An Incomplete and Unreliable Guide
 Short Stories from Hogwarts of Power, Politics and Pesky Poltergeists
 Short Stories from Hogwarts of Heroism, Hardship and Dangerous Hobbies

Video games
 Harry Potter video games

 Lego Creator: Harry Potter
 The Philosopher's Stone
 The Chamber of Secrets
 Creator: Harry Potter and the Chamber of Secrets
 Quidditch World Cup
 The Prisoner of Azkaban
 The Goblet of Fire
 The Order of the Phoenix
 The Half-Blood Prince
 Lego Harry Potter: Years 1–4

 The Deathly Hallows – Part 1
 The Deathly Hallows – Part 2
 Lego Harry Potter: Years 5–7
 Book of Spells
 Book of Potions
 Lego Dimensions
 Fantastic Beasts: Cases From the Wizarding World
 Hogwarts Mystery
 Wizards Unite
 Hogwarts Legacy

Universe details
 Harry Potter universe
 List of Harry Potter characters

 Harry Potter
 Ron Weasley
 Hermione Granger
 Lord Voldemort
 Albus Dumbledore
 Severus Snape
Ginny Weasley
Draco Malfoy
Neville Longbottom

Luna Lovegood
Minerva McGonagall
Rubeus Hagrid
Fred and George Weasley
Sirius Black
Remus Lupin
Bellatrix Lestrange
Cedric Diggory
Dolores Umbridge

Character groups
 List of supporting Harry Potter characters
 Order of the Phoenix (fictional organisation)
 Death Eaters
 Dumbledore's Army
 Hogwarts staff
 Places in Harry Potter
 Hogwarts School of Witchcraft and Wizardry
 Magic in Harry Potter
 Magical creatures in Harry Potter
 Magical objects in Harry Potter
 Ministry of Magic
Muggle
Quidditch

Attractions
Harry Potter in amusement parks
 The Wizarding World of Harry Potter
 Orlando
 Japan
 Hollywood
 Dragon Challenge
 Flight of the Hippogriff
 Hagrid's Magical Creatures Motorbike Adventure
 Harry Potter and the Escape from Gringotts
 Harry Potter and the Forbidden Journey
 Hogwarts Express
 Harry Potter Movie Magic Experience
 Exhibitions
 Harry Potter: The Exhibition
 Harry Potter: A History of Magic
 Warner Bros. Studio Tour London – The Making of Harry Potter

Fandom
Harry Potter fandom
 A Celebration of Harry Potter
 Harry Potter Alliance
 Mischief Management

Websites
Harry Potter Fan Zone
The Harry Potter Lexicon
HPANA
The Leaky Cauldron (website)
PotterCast
MuggleNet

Fan fiction
 All the Young Dudes
 Harry Potter and the Methods of Rationality
 Hogwarts School of Prayer and Miracles
 My Immortal
Fan films
 Hermione Granger and the Quarter Life Crisis
 Severus Snape and the Marauders
 Voldemort: Origins of the Heir
Parodies
 Potter Puppet Pals
Puffs, or Seven Increasingly Eventful Years at a Certain School of Magic and Magic
 Skulduggery Pleasant: Phase Two
A Very Potter Musical
 A Very Potter Musical (album)
 A Very Potter Sequel
 EP
 A Very Potter Senior Year
Wizard People, Dear Reader

 Wizard rock
 Wrockstock
Draco and the Malfoys
Harry and the Potters
Harry and the Potters (album)
Voldemort Can't Stop the Rock!
Harry and the Potters and the Power of Love
Lumos (album)
Harry and the Potters discography
Ministry of Magic (band)
Myles Kane

Analysis
 Harry Potter influences and analogues
 Harry Potter in translation
 Legal disputes over the Harry Potter series
Harry Potter in Calcutta
Hari Puttar: A Comedy of Terrors
 Tanya Grotter 
Warner Bros. Entertainment Inc. v. RDR Books
Politics of Harry Potter
 Religious debates over the Harry Potter series
 Harry, A History
 Harry Potter and the Sacred Text
 The Magical Worlds of Harry Potter
 Pollomuhku ja Posityyhtynen
 Potterless

Other
 Portkey Games
 Lego Harry Potter
 Harry Potter Trading Card Game
List of organisms named after the Harry Potter series

See also
 Harry Potter (disambiguation)

Harry Potter
Harry Potter
Harry Potter